Mask of the Red Death is a 1969 animated short film by Pavao Štalter (also main animator and main artist) and Branko Ranitović for Zagreb Film. It is an adaptation of Edgar Allan Poe's The Masque of the Red Death.

Development
The short film is notable for its use of texturized animation, which is difficult to execute convincingly. The authors themselves describe it as a mix of collage technique and "animated paintings". The movie was two years in production.

Reception 
Film critic and historian Giannalberto Bendazzi cited it as an example of a movie which would make people genuinely afraid. He praised the painting abilities of Štalter and described the movie as the one which invokes both admiration and disturbance. Some cite it as a potential influence for Terry Gilliam's Monty Python and the Holy Grail, specifically the plague ridden landscape. Film critic Ralph Stephenson described it as "perhaps the most impressive translation of Poe's ghostly world into the cartoon medium".

Due to its innovations in the use of background by mixing painting textures, collage and drawings, it was included in the anthology Art in Movement. It is regarded as among 10 best Croatian animated short films by Croatian film critics.

References

External links

1969 animated films
1969 films
Croatian animated short films
Yugoslav animated short films
Zagreb Film films
Films based on works by Edgar Allan Poe
Works based on The Masque of the Red Death